Looks and Smiles is a 1981 British drama film directed by Ken Loach. It is based on the novel of the same name, written by Barry Hines. The film was entered into the 1981 Cannes Film Festival, where Loach won the Young Cinema Award.

The film was shot in black-and-white entirely on location in Sheffield.  There is some Yorkshire dialect in the film, although not as much as in previous Loach-Hines collaborations such as Kes and The Price of Coal.  Despite this, the review in The New York Times complained that "a great deal of the dialogue remains unintelligible to the American ear."

Plot
A disadvantaged young man tries to get by in Margaret Thatcher's England. Writing in his book The Cinema of Ken Loach, Jacob Leigh comments: "Looks and Smiles reveals the depression people felt in the industrial North of England in the 1980s; but it is as depressing as Mick's life. ... Loach's characteristic attention to detail renders the film a period piece."

Cast
 Graham Green - Michael 'Mick' Walsh
 Carolyn Nicholson - Karen Lodge
 Tony Pitts - Alan Wright
 Roy Haywood - Phil
 Phil Askham - Mr. Walsh
 Pam Darrell - Mrs. Walsh
 Tracey Goodlad - Julie
 Patti Nicholls - Mrs. Wright
 Cilla Mason - Mrs. Lodge
 Les Hickin - George
 Arthur Davies - Eric Lodge
 Deirdre Costello - Jenny (as Deidre Costello)
 Jackie Shinn - Gatekeeper
 Christine Francis - Careers Officer
 Rita May - Receptionist

Aftermath
Ken Loach considered the film a failure and turned to making documentaries for several years afterwards, saying that the film failed to "create the outrage in the audience that should have been there".  He also considered it "the end of an era" as he avoided long camera shots in subsequent films.  A 2016 Guardian article wrote, "Even the most devoted fan found 1981’s Looks & Smiles painfully miserable".  In support of the film, it has been held up as one of Ken Loach's film that does not propagate one political view heavily, as opposed to Fatherland or Land and Freedom

References

External links
 
Full movie on Dailymotion

1981 films
1981 drama films
British drama films
British black-and-white films
Films directed by Ken Loach
Films scored by Marc Wilkinson
Films set in Sheffield
Films shot in South Yorkshire
Social realism in film
1980s English-language films
1980s British films